Fenixia is a genus of flowering plants in the family Asteraceae.

There is only one known species, Fenixia pauciflora, endemic to the Philippines.

References

Monotypic Asteraceae genera
Heliantheae
Endemic flora of the Philippines
Taxa named by Elmer Drew Merrill